Dodge Township may refer to:
 Dodge Township, Boone County, Iowa
 Dodge Township, Dubuque County, Iowa
 Dodge Township, Guthrie County, Iowa
 Dodge Township, Ford County, Kansas